The Croatian Republican Union ( or HRZ) was a political party in Croatia.

History
It was formed in 1951 in Buenos Aires by Ivan Oršanić as the Croatian Republican Party. The party was moved to Croatia in 1991, after democratic reforms in the country.

Party presidents 
Ivan Oršanić (1951-1968)
Ivo Korsky (1968-1991)

References

External links
Official party web page

Conservative parties in Croatia
Croatian nationalist parties
Defunct nationalist parties in Croatia
Political parties established in 1991
1991 establishments in Croatia
1951 establishments in Argentina